Jessica Au is an Australian editor and bookseller, and author of the novels Cargo and Cold Enough for Snow. Au won the inaugural Novel prize in 2022. She is based in Melbourne.

Au won both the 2023 Victorian Premier's Prize for Literature and Victorian Premier's Prize for Fiction for Cold Enough for Snow.

Awards and honours

Publications 

 Cargo (2011)
 Cold Enough for Snow (2022)

References

External links 
 

Living people
Australian women novelists
Writers from Melbourne
21st-century Australian novelists
21st-century Australian women writers
Year of birth missing (living people)